The year 1768 in architecture involved some significant events.

Events

 Work begins on Monticello near Charlottesville, Virginia, designed by Thomas Jefferson.
 Duchal House, Scotland, extended.
 In Bath, England, St James' Church is designed by John Palmer of Bath (between 1768-1769).
 Potseluev Bridge, St Petersburg, Russia, reconstructed to accommodate horse traffic.
 Architects Domenico Merlini and Szymon Bogumił Zug are ennobled in Poland.

Buildings and structures

Buildings completed

Nathaniel Hill Brick House, Montgomery, New York.
The Paragon, Bath, England, designed by Thomas Warr Attwood.
Petit Trianon, Versailles, France, originally designed by Ange-Jacques Gabriel by the order of King Louis XV for his long-term mistress, Madame de Pompadour, but used by Queen Marie Antoinette.
Blue Mosque, Yerevan.
Façade of Theatine Church, Munich, designed by François de Cuvilliés, is completed by his son.
Reconstruction of Puerta del Sol in Madrid and construction of Real Casa de Correos (post office) there, both begun by Ventura Rodríguez, are completed by Jaime Marquet.

Births
April 12 – John Sanders, architect, first pupil of Sir John Soane (died 1826)
May 11 – David Hamilton, Glasgow architect (died 1843)

Deaths
February 8 – George Dance the Elder, City of London surveyor and architect (born 1695)
March 11 – Giovanni Battista Vaccarini, Sicilian Baroque architect (born 1702)
April 14 – François de Cuvilliés, Walloon-born Bavarian architect (born 1695)

References

Architecture
Years in architecture
18th-century architecture